Jessika Roswall ( Jessika Vilhelmsson; born 18 December 1972) is a Swedish politician of the Moderate Party. She has served as Minister for European Union Affairs and Minister for Nordic Cooperation in the cabinet of Ulf Kristersson since 2022 and has been Member of the Riksdag since the 2010 general election, representing Uppsala County.

Early life and education
Roswall is the daughter of the lawyer Anders Roswall; her mother is a teacher. She graduated from the high school in 1991. She studied history at Stockholm University in 1995–1997, and then moved to Uppsala to study the law at Uppsala University. She graduated in law (LLM) in 2002.

Early career
After graduation, Roswall started working as a paralegal at the law firm Wigert & Placht. She then became a lawyer, specializing in criminal and family law.

Political career
At the same time, Roswall was a deputy of the municipal council in Enköping.  

In the 2010 parliamentary election, Roswall was elected as a member of parliament for the Moderate Party. As a newly appointed member of parliament, she became a member of the tax committee. Since 2011, she has been a member of the Civil Affairs Committee, where she works with consumer policy issues, among other things. Since 2015, she has also been a member of the Swedish Consumer Agency 's transparency council. She became her party’s spokesperson on EU relations in 2019.    

Since October 18, 2022, Roswall has been serving as Minister for EU Affairs and for Nordic Cooperation in the Kristersson Cabinet.

References 

 
|-

 

|-

 

|-

Living people
1972 births
Place of birth missing (living people)
21st-century Swedish politicians
21st-century Swedish women politicians
Members of the Riksdag 2010–2014
Members of the Riksdag 2014–2018
Members of the Riksdag 2018–2022
Members of the Riksdag 2022–2026
Members of the Riksdag from the Moderate Party
Women members of the Riksdag
Women government ministers of Sweden